Shifo (lit. stone Buddha) may refer to the following places in China:

Towns 
 Shifo, Shandong
 Shifo, Gansu

 Shifo, Henan, Zhongyuan District, Henan
 Shifo, Hebei, a town in Anguo, Hebei

Townships 

 Shifo Township, Zhejiang, a township in Longyou County, Zhejiang